The Chetwynd Baronetcy, of Brocton Hall in the County of Stafford, is a title in the Baronetage of Great Britain. It was created on 1 May 1795 for Sir George Chetwynd, Kt., of Brocton Hall, Staffordshire, for many years Clerk to the Privy Council. The second Baronet was member of parliament for Stafford and High Sheriff of Warwickshire in 1828. The fourth Baronet served as High Sheriff of Warwickshire in 1875. As of 13 June 2007 the presumed ninth Baronet has not successfully proven his succession and is therefore not on the Official Roll of the Baronetage, with the baronetcy dormant since 2004.

This family is a junior branch of the Chetwynds of Ingestre, Staffordshire. The first Baronet was a descendant of Thomas Chetwynd (d. 1555), whose brother Anthony Chetwynd was the grandfather of Walter Chetwynd, 1st Viscount Chetwynd (see Viscount Chetwynd). The first Baronet inherited an estate at Old Grendon, North Warwickshire, in 1798 and Grendon Hall (demolished 1935) became the family seat.

Chetwynd baronets, of Brocton Hall (1795)
Sir George Chetwynd, 1st Baronet (1739–1824)
Sir George Chetwynd, 2nd Baronet (1783–1850)
Sir George Chetwynd, 3rd Baronet (1808–1869)
Sir George Chetwynd, 4th Baronet (1849–1917)
Sir George Guy Chetwynd, 5th Baronet (1874–1935)
Sir Victor James Chetwynd, 6th Baronet (1902–1938)
Sir (Arthur Henry) Talbot Chetwynd, 7th Baronet (1887–1972)
Sir Arthur Ralph Chetwynd, 8th Baronet (1913–2004)
Sir Robin John Talbot Chetwynd, 9th Baronet (1941–2012) (presumed)
Sir Peter James Talbot Chetwynd, 10th Baronet (born 1973) (presumed)

See also
Viscount Chetwynd
Earl of Shrewsbury
Earl Talbot

References

Kidd, Charles, Williamson, David (editors). Debrett's Peerage and Baronetage (1990 edition). New York: St Martin's Press, 1990.

Baronetcies in the Baronetage of Great Britain
1795 establishments in Great Britain